Direct conversion may refer to:

 Direct energy conversion (DEC), a scheme for power extraction from nuclear fusion, 
 Direct-conversion receiver (DCR), a type of radio receiver.